The 1953–54 Santosh Trophy was the 13th edition of the Santosh Trophy, the main territorial competition in India. It was held in Calcutta, West Bengal. Managed by Balaidas Chatterjee, Bengal won their seventh title by defeating Mysore 3–1 in the final.

Bengal won their quarter-final match against Bihar, semifinal match against Bombay and the final against Mysore in replayed games.

Quarter final

P. K. Banerjee made his debut in Santosh Trophy, playing for Bihar.

Semifinal

Third place match

Final

Final Replay

References

Santosh Trophy seasons
1953–54 in Indian football